Henrikas is a Lithuanian masculine given name. It is the Lithuanian cognate of the German language name Heinrich and the English language name Henry. People with the name Henrikas include:

Henrikas Ciparis (b. 1941), Lithuanian painter
Henrikas Juškevičius (b. 1935), Lithuanian electrical engineer and journalist
Henrikas Natalevičius (b. 1953), Lithuanian painter
Henrikas Radauskas (1910–1970), Lithuanian poet and writer
Henrikas Žustautas (born 1994), Lithuanian sprint canoer

Similar and related names 
Enrico, Enrik, Enrikas, Enrike, Enrikė, Enriki, Enrikis, Enrique, Enrykas, Heinrich, Hendrik, Hendrikas, Henri, Henrichas, Henrik, Henryk, Indrek, Enris, Hari, Haris, Harry, Henris, Henry, Herkus, Henrikus.

Lithuanian masculine given names
Masculine given names